The Apple II (stylized as ) is an 8-bit home computer and one of the world's first highly successful mass-produced microcomputer products. It was designed primarily by Steve Wozniak; Jerry Manock developed the design of Apple II's foam-molded plastic case, Rod Holt developed the switching power supply, while Steve Jobs's role in the design of the computer was limited to overseeing Jerry Manock's work on the plastic case. It was introduced by Jobs and Wozniak at the 1977 West Coast Computer Faire, and marks Apple's first launch of a personal computer aimed at a consumer market—branded toward American households rather than businessmen or computer hobbyists.

Byte magazine referred to the Apple II, Commodore PET 2001, and TRS-80 as the "1977 Trinity". As the Apple II had the defining feature of being able to display color graphics, the Apple logo was redesigned to have a spectrum of colors.

The Apple II is the first model in the Apple II series, followed by Apple II+, Apple IIe, Apple IIc, and the 16-bit Apple IIGS—all of which remained compatible. Production of the last available model, Apple IIe, ceased in November 1993.

History
By 1976, Steve Jobs had convinced product designer Jerry Manock (who had formerly worked at Hewlett Packard designing calculators) to create the "shell" for the Apple II—a smooth case inspired by kitchen appliances that concealed the internal mechanics. The earliest Apple II computers were assembled in Silicon Valley and later in Texas; printed circuit boards were manufactured in Ireland and Singapore. The first computers went on sale on June 10, 1977 with an MOS Technology 6502 microprocessor running at 1.022 MHz ( of the NTSC color carrier), two game paddles (bundled until 1980, when they were found to violate FCC regulations), 4 KiB of RAM, an audio cassette interface for loading programs and storing data, and the Integer BASIC programming language built into ROMs. The video controller displayed 24 lines by 40 columns of monochrome, uppercase-only text on the screen (the original character set matches ASCII characters 20h to 5Fh), with NTSC composite video output suitable for display on a TV monitor or on a regular TV set (by way of a separate RF modulator). To reflect the computer's color graphics capability, the Apple logo on the casing had rainbow stripes, which remained a part of Apple's corporate logo until early 1998. Perhaps most significantly, the Apple II was a catalyst for personal computers across many industries; it opened the doors to software marketed at consumers.

Certain aspects of the system's design were influenced by Atari's arcade video game Breakout (1976), which was designed by Wozniak, who said: "A lot of features of the Apple II went in because I had designed Breakout for Atari. I had designed it in hardware. I wanted to write it in software now". This included his design of color graphics circuitry, the addition of game paddle support and sound, and graphics commands in Integer BASIC, with which he wrote Brick Out, a software clone of his own hardware game. Wozniak said in 1984: "Basically, all the game features were put in just so I could show off the game I was familiar with—Breakout—at the Homebrew Computer Club. It was the most satisfying day of my life [when] I demonstrated Breakout—totally written in BASIC. It seemed like a huge step to me. After designing hardware arcade games, I knew that being able to program them in BASIC was going to change the world."

Overview
In the May 1977 issue of Byte, Steve Wozniak published a detailed description of his design; the article began, "To me, a personal computer should be small, reliable, convenient to use, and inexpensive."

The Apple II used peculiar engineering shortcuts to save hardware and reduce costs, such as:
 Taking advantage of the way the 6502 processor accesses memory: it occurs only on alternate phases of the clock cycle; video generation circuitry memory access on the otherwise unused phase avoids memory contention issues and interruptions of the video stream.
 This arrangement simultaneously eliminated the need for a separate refresh circuit for DRAM chips, as video transfer accessed each row of dynamic memory within the timeout period. In addition, it did not require separate RAM chips for video RAM, while the PET and TRS-80 had SRAM chips for video.
 Rather than use a complex analog-to-digital circuit to read the outputs of the game controller, Wozniak used a simple timer circuit whose period is proportional to the resistance of the game controller, and he used a software loop to measure the timer.
 A single 14.31818 MHz master oscillator (fM) was divided by various ratios to produce all other required frequencies, including microprocessor clock signals (fM/14), video transfer counters, and color-burst samples (fM/4).

The text and graphics screens have a complex arrangement. For instance, the scanlines were not stored in sequential areas of memory. This complexity was reportedly due to Wozniak's realization that the method would allow for the refresh of dynamic RAM as a side effect (as described above). This method had no cost overhead to have software calculate or look up the address of the required scanline and avoided the need for significant extra hardware. Similarly, in high-resolution graphics mode, color is determined by pixel position and thus can be implemented in software, saving Wozniak the chips needed to convert bit patterns to colors. This also allowed for subpixel font rendering, since orange and blue pixels appear half a pixel-width farther to the right on the screen than green and purple pixels.

The Apple II at first used data cassette storage, like most other microcomputers of the time. In 1978, the company introduced an external -inch floppy disk drive, called Disk II (stylized as Disk ][), attached through a controller card that plugs into one of the computer's expansion slots (usually slot 6). The Disk II interface, created by Wozniak, is regarded as an engineering masterpiece for its economy of electronic components.

The approach taken in the Disk II controller is typical of Wozniak's designs. With a few small-scale logic chips and a cheap PROM (programmable read-only memory), he created a functional floppy disk interface at a fraction of the component cost of standard circuit configurations.

Case design

The first production Apple II computers had hand-molded cases; these had visible bubbles and other lumps in them from the imperfect plastic molding process, which was soon switched to machine molding. In addition, the initial case design had no vent openings, causing high heat buildup from the PCB and resulting in the plastic softening and sagging. Apple added vent holes to the case within three months of production; customers with the original case could have them replaced at no charge.

PCB revisions
The Apple II's printed circuit board (PCB) underwent several revisions, as Steve Wozniak made modifications to it. The earliest version was known as Revision 0, and the first 6,000 units shipped used it. Later revisions added a color killer circuit to prevent color fringing when the computer was in text mode, as well as modifications to improve the reliability of cassette I/O. Revision 0 Apple IIs powered up in an undefined mode and had garbage on-screen, requiring the user to press Reset. This was eliminated in later board revisions. Revision 0 Apple IIs could display only four colors in hi-res mode, but Wozniak was able to increase this to six hi-res colors on later board revisions.

The PCB had three RAM banks for a total of 24 RAM chips. Original Apple IIs had jumper switches to adjust RAM size, and RAM configurations could be 4, 8, 12, 16, 20, 24, 32, 36, or 48 KiB. The three smallest memory configurations used 4kx1 DRAMs, with larger ones using 16kx1 DRAMs, or mix of 4-kilobyte and 16-kilobyte banks (the chips in any one bank have to be the same size). The early Apple II+ models retained this feature, but after a drop in DRAM prices, Apple redesigned the circuit boards without the jumpers, so that only 16kx1 chips were supported. A few months later, they started shipping all machines with a full 48 KiB complement of DRAM.

Unlike most machines, all integrated circuits on the Apple II PCB were socketed; although this cost more to manufacture and created the possibility of loose chips causing a system malfunction, it was considered preferable to make servicing and replacement of bad chips easier.

The Apple II PCB lacks any means of generating an interrupt request, although expansion cards may generate one. Program code had to stop everything to perform any I/O task; like many of the computer's other idiosyncrasies, this was due to cost reasons and Steve Wozniak assuming interrupts were not needed for gaming or using the computer as a teaching tool.

Display and graphics

Color on the Apple II series uses a quirk of the NTSC television signal standard, which made color display relatively easy and inexpensive to implement. The original NTSC television signal specification was black and white. Color was added later by adding a 3.58-megahertz subcarrier signal that was partially ignored by black-and-white TV sets. Color is encoded based on the phase of this signal in relation to a reference color burst signal. The result is that the position, size, and intensity of a series of pulses define color information. These pulses can translate into pixels on the computer screen, with the possibility of exploiting composite artifact colors.

The Apple II display provides two pixels per subcarrier cycle. When the color burst reference signal is turned on and the computer attached to a color display, it can display green by showing one alternating pattern of pixels, magenta with an opposite pattern of alternating pixels, and white by placing two pixels next to each other. Blue and orange are available by tweaking the pixel offset by half a pixel-width in relation to the color-burst signal. The high-resolution display offers more colors by compressing more (and narrower) pixels into each subcarrier cycle.

The coarse, low-resolution graphics display mode works differently, as it can output a pattern of dots per pixel to offer more color options. These patterns are stored in the character generator ROM, and replace the text character bit patterns when the computer is switched to low-res graphics mode. The text mode and low-res graphics mode use the same memory region and the same circuitry is used for both.

A single HGR page occupied 8 KiB of RAM; in practice this meant that the user had to have at least 12 KiB of total RAM to use HGR mode and 20 KiB to use two pages. Early Apple II games from the 1977–79 period often ran only in text or low-resolution mode in order to support users with small memory configurations; HGR not being near universally supported by games until 1980.

Sound
Rather than a dedicated sound-synthesis chip, the Apple II has a toggle circuit that can only emit a click through a built-in speaker or a line-out jack; all other sounds (including two-, three- and, eventually, four-voice music and playback of audio samples and speech synthesis) are generated entirely by software that clicked the speaker at just the right times. Similar techniques are used for cassette storage: cassette output works the same as the speaker, and input is a simple zero-crossing detector that serves as a relatively crude (1-bit) audio digitizer. Routines in machine ROM encode and decode data in frequency-shift keying for the cassette.

Programming languages

Initially, the Apple II was shipped with Integer BASIC encoded in the motherboard ROM chips. Written by Wozniak, the interpreter enabled users to write software applications without needing to purchase additional development utilities. Written with game programmers and hobbyists in mind, the language only supported the encoding of numbers in 16-bit integer format. Since it only supported integers between -32768 and +32767 (signed 16-bit integer), it was less suitable to business software, and Apple soon received complaints from customers. Because Steve Wozniak was busy developing the Disk II hardware, he did not have time to modify Integer BASIC for floating point support. Apple instead licensed Microsoft's 6502 BASIC to create Applesoft BASIC.

Disk users normally purchased a so-called Language Card, which had Applesoft in ROM, and was sat below the Integer BASIC ROM in system memory. The user could switch between either BASIC by typing FP or INT in BASIC prompt. Apple also offered a different version of Applesoft for cassette users, which occupied low memory, and was started by using the LOAD command in Integer BASIC.

As shipped, Apple II incorporated a machine code monitor with commands for displaying and altering the computer's RAM, either one byte at a time, or in blocks of 256 bytes at once. This enabled programmers to write and debug machine code programs without further development software. The computer powers on into the monitor ROM, displaying a * prompt. From there, Ctrl+B enters BASIC, or a machine language program can be loaded from cassette. Disk software can be booted with Ctrl+P followed by 6, referring to Slot 6 which normally contained the Disk II controller.

A 6502 assembler was soon offered on disk, and later the UCSD compiler and operating system for the Pascal language were made available. The Pascal system requires a 16 KiB RAM card to be installed in the language card position (expansion slot 0) in addition to the full 48 KiB of motherboard memory.

Manual
The first 1,000 or so Apple IIs shipped in 1977 with a 68-page mimeographed "Apple II Mini Manual", hand-bound with brass paper fasteners. This was the basis for the Apple II Reference Manual, which became known as the Red Book for its red cover, published in January 1978. All existing customers who sent in their warranty cards were sent free copies of the Red Book. The Apple II Reference Manual contained the complete schematic of the entire computer's circuitry, and a complete source listing of the "Monitor" ROM firmware that served as the machine's BIOS.

An Apple II manual signed by Steve Jobs in 1980 with the inscription "Julian, your generation is the first to grow up with computers. Go change the world." sold at auction for $787,484 in 2021.

Operating system
The original Apple II provided an operating system in ROM along with a BASIC variant called Integer BASIC. The only form of storage available was cassette tape which was inefficiently slow and, worse, unreliable. In 1977 when Apple decided against the popular but clunky CP/M operating system for Wozniak's innovative disk controller design, it contracted Shepardson Microsystems for $13,000 to write an Apple DOS for the Apple II series. At Shepardson, Paul Laughton developed the crucial disk drive software in just 35 days, a remarkably short deadline by any standard. Apple's Disk II -inch floppy disk drive was released in 1978. The final and most popular version of this software was Apple DOS 3.3.

Apple DOS was superseded by ProDOS, which supported a hierarchical filesystem and larger storage devices. With an optional third-party Z80-based expansion card, the Apple II could boot into the CP/M operating system and run WordStar, dBase II, and other CP/M software. With the release of MousePaint in 1984 and the Apple IIGS in 1986, the platform took on the look of the Macintosh user interface, including a mouse.

Apple released Applesoft BASIC in 1977, a more advanced variant of the language which users could run instead of Integer BASIC for more capabilities.

Some commercial Apple II software booted directly and did not use standard DOS disk formats. This discouraged the copying or modifying of the software on the disks, and improved loading speed.

Third-party devices and applications
When the Apple II initially shipped in June 1977, no expansion cards were available for the slots. This meant that the user did not have any way of connecting a modem or a printer. One popular hack involved connecting a teletype machine to the cassette output.

Wozniak's open-architecture design and Apple II's multiple expansion slots permitted a wide variety of third-party devices, including peripheral cards, such as serial controllers, display controllers, memory boards, hard disks, networking components, and real-time clocks. There were plug-in expansion cards—such as the Z-80 SoftCard—that permitted Apple II to use the Z80 processor and run programs for the CP/M operating system, including the dBase II database and the WordStar word processor. The Z80 card also allowed the connection to a modem, and thereby to any networks that a user might have access to. In the early days, such networks were scarce. But they expanded significantly with the development of bulletin board systems in later years. There was also a third-party 6809 card that allowed OS-9 Level One to be run. Third-party sound cards greatly improved audio capabilities, allowing simple music synthesis and text-to-speech functions. Apple II accelerator cards doubled or quadrupled the computer's speed.

Early Apple IIs were often sold with a Sup'R'Mod, which allowed the composite video signal to be viewed in a television.

The Soviet Union radio-electronics industry designed Apple II-compatible computer Agat. Roughly 12,000 Agat 7 and 9 models were produced and they were widely used in Soviet schools. Agat 9 computers could run "Apple II" compatibility and native modes. "Apple II" mode allowed to run wider variety of (presumably pirated) Apple II software, but at the expense of less RAM. Because of that Soviet developers preferred native mode over "Apple II" compatibility mode.

Reception

Jesse Adams Stein wrote, "As the first company to release a 'consumer appliance' micro-computer, Apple Computer offers us a clear view of this shift from a machine to an appliance." But the company also had "to negotiate the attitudes of its potential buyers, bearing in mind social anxieties about the uptake of new technologies in multiple contexts. The office, the home and the 'office-in-the-home' were implicated in these changing spheres of gender stereotypes and technological development." After seeing a crude, wire-wrapped prototype demonstrated by Wozniak and Steve Jobs in November 1976, Byte predicted in April 1977, that the Apple II "may be the first product to fully qualify as the 'appliance computer' ... a completed system which is purchased off the retail shelf, taken home, plugged in and used". The computer's color graphics capability especially impressed the magazine. The magazine published a favorable review of the computer in March 1978, concluding: "For the user that wants color graphics, the Apple II is the only practical choice available in the 'appliance' computer class."

Personal Computer World in August 1978 also cited the color capability as a strength, stating that "the prime reason that anyone buys an Apple II must surely be for the colour graphics". While mentioning the "oddity" of the artifact colors that produced output "that is not always what one wishes to do", it noted that "no-one has colour graphics like this at this sort of price". The magazine praised the sophisticated monitor software, user expandability, and comprehensive documentation. The author concluded that "the Apple II is a very promising machine" which "would be even more of a temptation were its price slightly lower ... for the moment, colour is an Apple II".

Although it sold well from the launch, the initial market was to hobbyists and computer enthusiasts. Sales expanded exponentially into the business and professional market, when the spreadsheet program VisiCalc was launched in mid-1979. VisiCalc is credited as the defining killer app in the microcomputer industry.

During the first five years of operations, revenues doubled about every four months. During this period the sole products of the company were the Apple II and its peripherals, accessories, and software.

References

External links

 Additional documentation in Bitsavers PDF Document archive
 Apple II on Old-computers.com
 Online Apple II Resource
 Apple2History.org

Apple II computers
Computer-related introductions in 1977
6502-based home computers
8-bit computers
Products and services discontinued in 1979

ca:Apple II